Brighton Chipungu (born 11 October 2001) is a Zimbabwean cricketer. He made his first-class debut on 18 March 2021, for Mountaineers, in the 2020–21 Logan Cup. He made his Twenty20 debut on 10 April 2021, for Mountaineers, in the 2020–21 Zimbabwe Domestic Twenty20 Competition. He made his List A debut on 18 April 2021, for Mountaineers, in the 2020–21 Pro50 Championship.

References

External links
 

2001 births
Living people
Zimbabwean cricketers
Mountaineers cricketers
Place of birth missing (living people)